
Seychelles at the 1994 Commonwealth Games was abbreviated SEY.

Medals

Gold
none

Silver
none

Bronze
Rival Cadeau — Boxing, Men's Light Middleweight

Seychelles at the Commonwealth Games
C
Nations at the 1994 Commonwealth Games